Son Hyun-joo (born June 24, 1965) is a South Korean actor. Since 1991, he has starred in numerous television series and films, such as First Love (1996), To Be With You (2002), My Rosy Life (2005), Tazza (2008), My Too Perfect Sons (2009), Definitely Neighbors (2010), Secretly, Greatly (2013), Empire of Gold (2013), and Criminal Minds (2017).

Most notable in his filmography are two low-profile projects in which he played the leading role, both of which became unexpected hits: critically acclaimed revenge drama The Chaser (2012), and mystery thriller film Hide and Seek (2013). In year 2017, Son won the Best Actor award at the 39th Moscow international film festival for his role in the movie Ordinary Person.

Filmography

Film

Television series

Variety show

Discography

Awards and nominations

References

External links
 
 
 
 

South Korean male television actors
South Korean male film actors
Chung-Ang University alumni
Living people
1965 births
People from North Gyeongsang Province